Charley Davison is a British amateur boxer.

Davison started boxing at the age of eight, trained by her father at home because the local boxing club did not accept girls. She fought Ornella Wahner in 2010 and 2011, before taking a seven year break from boxing and then winning the national championship in 2019.

In June 2021, Davison qualified to represent Great Britain at the 2020 Summer Olympics, and reached the final of the 2020 European Boxing Olympic Qualification Tournament by defeating Giordana Sorrentino via unanimous points decision in the semi-final. She lost in the final of the Qualification event to Buse Naz Çakıroğlu by split decision.

References

External links
 

Living people
English women boxers
Flyweight boxers
1994 births
Olympic boxers of Great Britain
Boxers at the 2020 Summer Olympics